Footstep or Footsteps may refer to:

Music 
 "Footsteps" (Steve Lawrence song), 1960
 “Footsteps”, a 1983 song by The Motels
 "Footsteps" (Pop Evil song), 2015
 "Footsteps" (Dardanelles song), 2007
 “Footsteps” (Pearl Jam song), 1992
 "Footsteps" (Ri Jong-o song), a 2009 North Korean propaganda song
 “Footsteps”, a 1990 song by Alison Moyet from her album Hoodoo
 “Footsteps”, a 1994 rock song by Stiltskin from their album The Mind's Eye
 "Footsteps", a 1999 song by Pet Shop Boys from their album Nightlife
 Footsteps (album), a 2009 album by Chris de Burgh

Literature and film 
 Footsteps (1974 film), a 1974 short film by Peter Biziou and Alan Parker
 Footsteps (film), a 2003 thriller film directed by John Badham
 Footsteps (2006 film), a 2006 British film directed by Gareth Evans
 Footsteps (2010), a thriller film starring Marshall Bell
 Footsteps (novel), a 1985 novel by Pramoedya Ananta Toer
 Footsteps Press (see T. E. D. Klein for some book references)
 Footsteps, a pull-out section in Living History Magazine
 Footsteps (autobiography), the 1985 autobiography of British biographer Richard Holmes

Other 
 Footstep 11, a 2007 youth conference at Moneague College hosted by Global Footsteps
 "Footprints" (poem), a poem about footprints in the sand
 Footsteps (organization), an organization for people who have left or want to leave the Haredi Jewish community

See also 
 Footfall, a 1985 science fiction novel written by Larry Niven and Jerry Pournelle
 Footprint, the term for prints made by feet, bare or otherwise